Elwood Thomas Cooke (July 5, 1913 – April 16, 2004) was an amateur American tennis player in the 1930s and 1940s.

Tennis career
Elwood Cooke started playing tennis before his junior year at Benson Polytechnic High School. He played for the school team in the Portland Interscholastic League, never losing in singles matches and finishing with the team in 2nd place in his junior and senior years.

Cooke was ranked in Top 10 in the United States in 1938 (ranked No. 7), 1939 (No. 6), 1940 (No. 9), and 1945 (No. 4), whilst reaching as high as World No. 8 in Gordon Lowe's amateur rankings for 1939.

At Wimbledon, Cooke reached the singles final in 1939 (beating Bunny Austin and Henner Henkel before falling to Bobby Riggs), but won the doubles title that year with Riggs. He was the U.S. Indoor Doubles champion with Riggs in 1940. Cooke reached the semifinals of the French Championships in 1939 (losing to Don McNeill) and the U.S. National Championships in 1945 (losing to Frank Parker). He reached the U. S. quarterfinals in 1940 and 1943.

At the Cincinnati Masters, he reached both the singles and the doubles final in 1945. He lost the singles final to future International Tennis Hall of Fame enshrinee Bill Talbert. In the Oregon State Tournament, he won the singles title in 1936. In the Pacific Northwest Sectional, he won the singles title in 1935 and 1936. He was a naval officer during World War II, and was married to International Tennis Hall of Famer Sarah Palfrey Cooke.

After he retired from tournament play, he was the head tennis professional at Sunningdale Country Club in Scarsdale, New York from 1961 to 1981.

Personal life
He was married to tennis star Sarah Palfrey from 1940 to 1949.

References

External links
 

1913 births
2004 deaths
American male tennis players
French Championships (tennis) champions
Sportspeople from Ogden, Utah
Tennis people from Utah
Benson Polytechnic High School alumni
Wimbledon champions (pre-Open Era)
Grand Slam (tennis) champions in men's doubles
Grand Slam (tennis) champions in mixed doubles
Professional tennis players before the Open Era